Edendale may refer to:

Edendale, former name of Eden Landing, California
Edendale, Los Angeles, California, historical district in Los Angeles
Edendale, Louisiana, a fictional town which is the setting of the U.S. TV series Star-Crossed 
Edendale, New Zealand, town in the Southland region
Edendale, South Africa, near Pietermaritzburg
Edendale (album) 2009 album by Norwegian rock band BigBang